The 2013 World Wrestling Championships was the 9th edition of World Wrestling Championships of combined events and were held from September 16 to 22 in Budapest, Hungary.

Medal table

Team ranking

Medal summary

Men's freestyle

Men's Greco-Roman

Women's freestyle

Participating nations
681 competitors from 87 nations participated.

 (2)
 (2)
 (3)
 (13)
 (1)
 (7)
 (18)
 (21)
 (9)
 (20)
 (2)
 (14)
 (1)
 (21)
 (3)
 (9)
 (5)
 (11)
 (7)
 (2)
 (6)
 (7)
 (1)
 (6)
 (5)
 (7)
 (14)
 (17)
 (1)
 (13)
 (1)
 (1)
 (1)
 (4)
 (21)
 (21)
 (14)
 (2)
 (4)
 (4)
 (21)
 (1)
 (21)
 (12)
 (5)
 (6)
 (2)
 (2)
 (1)
 (8)
 (14)
 (14)
 (1)
 (1)
 (1)
 (3)
 (1)
 (7)
 (4)
 (1)
 (2)
 (2)
 (18)
 (1)
 (4)
 (1)
 (15)
 (21)
 (3)
 (5)
 (8)
 (1)
 (4)
 (17)
 (6)
 (5)
 (10)
 (3)
 (4)
 (3)
 (20)
 (21)
 (1)
 (21)
 (12)
 (17)
 (9)

References 

Results Book

External links 
 

 
World Wrestling Championships
FILA Wrestling World Championships
World Wrestling Championships
International sports competitions in Budapest
International wrestling competitions hosted by Hungary